Anbyon Field is a 1000 ha wetland site in Kangwon Province of North Korea.  It is one of the state's designated Natural Monuments and has been identified by BirdLife International as an Important Bird Area (IBA) because it supports a population of endangered red-crowned cranes.

References

Important Bird Areas of North Korea
Natural monuments of North Korea
Wetlands of North Korea
Kangwon Province (North Korea)